The Karnataka Legislative Council, (officially in Kannada, Karnataka Vidhana Parishad) is the upper house of the bicameral legislature of Karnataka state in south western India.

Members of Karnataka Legislative Council 
This is a list of current and past members of the Karnataka Legislative Council. The state elects members for a term of 6 years. 25 members are indirectly elected by the state legislators, 25 members are elected by Local Authorities, 7 from Graduates constituencies and 7 from teachers constituencies. The Governor of Karnataka nominates up to 11 eminent people as members from various fields.

 Star (*) represents current members
 MLA - elected by Members of Karnataka Legislative Assembly
 LA - Local Authorities
 GR - Graduates
 TR - Teachers
 NOM - Nominated

References 

 
Karnataka
Legislative Council